Brouillards ("Mists" or "Fog") is the first prelude of Claude Debussy's second set of preludes. It can be considered as the most harmonically complex of the entire series of preludes, hinting at polytonality. The left hand mainly employs the C diatonic collection, modulating shortly in the second theme and reverting in the coda, while the right hand uses the A-flat minor diatonic collection on E-flat, like the left hand modulating briefly before returning.

References

Preludes by Claude Debussy
1913 compositions